Angerja is a village in Kohila Parish, Rapla County in northwestern Estonia. It has a population of 65 (as of 1 October 2008) and an area of 12.59 km2.

A tower house was erected around 1400 as seat of a vassal of the Teutonic Knights.

References

Villages in Rapla County
Castles of the Teutonic Knights
Kreis Harrien